Pursuit Point is a mostly ice-covered peninsula on south-eastern Wiencke Island, one of the larger islands of the Palmer Archipelago of Antarctica.

Important Bird Area
The peninsula has been identified as an Important Bird Area (IBA) by BirdLife International because it supports breeding colonies of about 200 pairs of chinstrap penguins and 140 pairs of imperial shags.

References

Important Bird Areas of Antarctica
Seabird colonies
Headlands of the Palmer Archipelago
Wiencke Island
Penguin colonies